Deep Crimson is a 1996 Mexican crime film directed by Arturo Ripstein, written by Paz Alicia Garciadiego and starring Regina Orozco and Daniel Giménez Cacho. Like The Honeymoon Killers before it, the film is a dramatization of the story of "Lonely Hearts Killers", Raymond Fernandez and Martha Beck, who committed a string of murders of women in the 1940s.

Plot summary

Cast
 Regina Orozco as Coral Fabre
 Daniel Giménez Cacho as Nicolás Estrella
 Sherlyn as Teresa
 Giovani Florido as Carlitos (as Giovanni Florido)
 Fernando Palavicini as Don Dimas (as Fernando Soler P.)
 Patricia Reyes Spíndola as Sra. Ruelas
 Alexandra Vicencio as Imelda (as Alexandra Vincenzio)
 Julieta Egurrola as Juanita Norton

Reception

Critical reception
On Rotten Tomatoes, the film holds an approval rating of 80% based on 10 reviews, with a weighted average rating of 6.6/10.

Awards and honors
The film won eight Ariel Awards, including Best Actor and Best Actress and was nominated for the Golden Ariel.  In addition, it was awarded Honorable Mention in the Latin American Cinema category at Sundance and won three Golden Osellas at the Venice Film Festival.  It was Mexico's official submission for the Academy Award for Best Foreign Language Film, but it failed to earn a nomination.

See also
 The Honeymoon Killers, a 1969 film about the same events
 Lonely Hearts, a 2006 film about the same events
 Alleluia, a 2014 film about the same events
 List of submissions to the 70th Academy Awards for Best Foreign Language Film
 List of Mexican submissions for the Academy Award for Best Foreign Language Film

References

External links
 
 
 
 

1996 films
1990s Spanish-language films
Films set in the 1940s
1996 crime drama films
1990s serial killer films
Crime films based on actual events
Films directed by Arturo Ripstein
Films scored by David Mansfield
Mexican thriller films
1990s Mexican films